Lafayette County is a county located in the north central portion of the state of Florida. As of the 2020 census, the population was 8,226, making it the second-least populous county in Florida. The county seat is Mayo. Lafayette County is a prohibition or partially dry county, allowing retail sales of beer.

History
Lafayette County was created on December 23, 1856, from part of Madison County. At the time it comprised all the area of present-day Lafayette and Dixie counties. The county was named in honor of the Marquis de Lafayette, the French general who rendered assistance to the Continental Army in the American Revolutionary War. The famed Suwannee River forms the entire eastern boundary. The county courts first met at the home of Ariel Jones near Fayetteville. The county seat was New Troy until the court house burned down on New Year's Eve, 1892. It was moved to Mayo in 1893, and Mayo is currently Lafayette's only incorporated town. The moving of the courthouse was the end for New Troy. The Gainesville Sun states that houses were dismantled for their timber and bricks, hardwoods replaced the fields, steamboat traffic ended in 1899, and the ferry closed in 1917. In 1921 the lower part of the county was removed to create Dixie County.

Historic sites
Historic sites in Lafayette County include:
 The Hal W. Adams Bridge built in 1947 across the Suwannee River 3 mi (5 km) north of Mayo. It was Florida's first suspension bridge.
 The (second) Old Lafayette County Courthouse, built in 1893–1894, now an inn.
 The current Lafayette County Courthouse built in 1908.

Geography

Adjacent counties
 Suwannee County - east
 Gilchrist County - southeast
 Dixie County - south
 Taylor County - west
 Madison County - northwest

Demographics

As of the 2020 United States census, there were 8,226 people, 2,315 households, and 1,655 families residing in the county.

As of the census of 2000, there were 7,022 people, 2,142 households and 1,591 families residing in the county. The population density was 13 people per square mile (5/km2). There were 2,660 housing units at an average density of 5 per square mile (2/km2). The racial makeup of the county was 79.27% White, 14.37% Black or African American, 0.71% Native American, 0.13% Asian, 0.01% Pacific Islander, 4.30% from other races, and 1.21% from two or more races. 9.14% of the population were Hispanic or Latino of any race. In terms of ancestry, 41.1% were English, 8.0% were Irish, 7.1% were American, and 5.3% were German.

There were 2,142 households, out of which 34.00% had children under the age of 18 living with them, 59.20% were married couples living together, 9.20% had a female householder with no husband present, and 25.70% were non-families. 22.00% of all households were made up of individuals, and 10.10% had someone living alone who was 65 years of age or older. The average household size was 2.66 and the average family size was 3.06.

In the county, the population was spread out, with 21.70% under the age of 18, 10.70% from 18 to 24, 34.00% from 25 to 44, 21.30% from 45 to 64, and 12.40% who were 65 years of age or older. The median age was 35 years. For every 100 females there were 148.80 males. For every 100 females age 18 and over, there were 157.80 males.

The median income for a household in the county was $30,651, and the median income for a family was $35,020. Males had a median income of $25,030 versus $22,007 for females. The per capita income for the county was $13,087. About 12.90% of families and 17.50% of the population were below the poverty line, including 23.70% of those under age 18 and 17.30% of those age 65 or over.

Politics

Parks
Parks in the county include Lafayette Blue Springs State Park and Troy Spring State Park, both accessible to the Suwannee River.

Library
The Lafayette County Public Library is part of the Three Rivers Regional Library System, which also serves Gilchrist, Dixie, and Taylor counties.

Communities

Town
 Mayo

Census-designated place
 Day

Other unincorporated communities
 Airline
 Alton
 Buckville
 Cooks Hammock
 Hatchbend
 Midway

See also
 Dry counties

Notes

References

External links

Government links/Constitutional offices
 Lafayette County Board of County Commissioners
 Lafayette County Supervisor of Elections
 Lafayette County Property Appraiser
 Lafayette County Sheriff's Office
 Lafayette County Tax Collector

Special districts
 Lafayette County Schools
 Suwannee River Water Management District

Judicial branch
 Lafayette County Clerk of Courts
  Public Defender, 3rd Judicial Circuit of Florida serving Columbia, Dixie, Hamilton, Lafayette, Madison, Suwannee, and Taylor Counties
  Office of the State Attorney, 3rd Judicial Circuit of Florida
  Circuit and County Court for the 3rd Judicial Circuit of Florida

 
Florida counties
1853 establishments in Florida
North Florida
Populated places established in 1853